Hypercallia haematella is a moth of the  family Depressariidae. It is found in Mauritius and South Africa.

References
 Felder, C., Felder, R. & Rogenhofer, A. F. 1864–1875. Reise der österreichischen Fregatte Novara um die Erde in den Jahren 1857, 1858, 1859 unter den Befehlen des Commodore B. von Wüllerstorf-Urbair. Zoologischer Theil. Zweiter Band. Abtheilung 2, Heft 4, Lepidoptera. Atlas der Heterocera. - — 2:1–20, pls. 1–140. (on Plate 138/CXXXVIII, fig.61)

Hypercallia
Moths of Sub-Saharan Africa
Moths of Mauritius
Moths described in 1875
Lepidoptera of South Africa